Thomas Bayly may refer to:

Thomas Bayly (Maryland politician) (1775–1829), Maryland congressman
Thomas Monteagle Bayly (1775–1834), Virginia congressman
Thomas H. Bayly (1810–1856), Virginia congressman and son of Thomas M. Bayly
Thomas Haynes Bayly (1797–1839), English poet and songwriter
Thomas Bayly (bishop) (died 1670), Anglican bishop in Ireland
Thomas Bayly or Thomas Bailey (priest) (died 1657), religious controversialist
Thomas Bayly or Thomas Baily (died 1591), Master of Clare Hall and Catholic priest

See also
Thomas Bayley (disambiguation)
Thomas Bayly Howell (1767–1815), English lawyer and writer
Thomas Bailey (disambiguation)
Thomas Baillie (disambiguation)